The 2020 Northeast Conference women's basketball tournament was the postseason women's basketball tournament for the Northeast Conference for the 2019–20 NCAA Division I women's basketball season. All tournament games were scheduled to be played at the home arena of the highest seed from March 9 through March 15, 2020. On March 12, the NCAA announced that the tournament was cancelled due to the coronavirus pandemic.

Seeds
The top eight teams in the Northeast Conference are eligible to compete in the conference tournament. Teams were seeded by record within the conference, with a tiebreaker system to seed teams with identical conference records.
Note: Merrimack College joined the Northeast Conference from Division II Northeast-10 Conference. They are not eligible this year for the NEC Tournament.

Bracket and results

* denotes overtime
# denotes games cancelled due to COVID-19

See also
2020 Northeast Conference men's basketball tournament

References

External links
2020 Northeast Conference Women's Basketball Championship

Northeast Conference women's basketball tournament
2019–20 Northeast Conference women's basketball season
Northeast Conference women's basketball tournament